Goslesopitomnika is a rural locality (a settlement) in Nizhnevedugskoye Rural Settlement, Semiluksky District, Voronezh Oblast, Russia. The population was 222 as of 2010.

Geography 
Goslesopitomnika is located 36 km west of Semiluki (the district's administrative centre) by road. Izbishche is the nearest rural locality.

References 

Rural localities in Semiluksky District